Five For Freddie: Bucky Pizzarelli's Tribute To Freddie Green is a jazz tribute album by Bucky Pizzarelli to the late jazz guitarist Freddie Green.

Track listing
 "Groovin' High"
 "Bustin' Suds"
 "For Lena and Lennie"
 "Up In the Blues"
 "Down For Double"
 "High Tide"
 "Dreamsville"
 "Shiny Stockings"
 "Centerpiece"
 "Corner Pocket"
 "All Of Me"
 "Sophisticated Swing"
 "Lester Leaps In"

Personnel
Bucky Pizzarelliguitar, leader
Warren Vachecornet
John Bunchpiano
Jay Leonhartdouble bass
Mickey Rokerdrums

References

2007 albums
Bucky Pizzarelli albums
Swing albums
Arbors Records albums
Freddie Green tribute albums